Alessia Durante (born 14 May 1999) is an Italian weightlifter. She won the silver medal in the women's 71kg event at the 2021 European Weightlifting Championships held in Moscow, Russia.

In 2019, she won the gold medal in the women's junior 71kg event at the European Junior & U23 Weightlifting Championships in Bucharest, Romania. In 2020, she won the silver medal in her event at the Roma 2020 World Cup in Rome, Italy.

References

External links 
 

Living people
1999 births
Place of birth missing (living people)
Italian female weightlifters
European Weightlifting Championships medalists
21st-century Italian women